The Anderton family was a notable family, which was divided into several branches and lived in various places throughout the historic county of Lancashire, England. After the Reformation they provided a number of prominent Roman Catholics.

Prominent members included:

James Anderton (1557–1618).
Laurence Anderton, alias Scroop (1577–1643).
Venerable Robert Anderton (1560–1586).
Roger Anderton (died 1640).
Thomas Anderton (1611–1671).

See also 

Anderton baronets

References

History of Lancashire
History of Catholicism in England